Hannu Taipale (born 22 June 1940 in Veteli) is a Finnish former cross-country skier who competed during the 1960s. He won a bronze medal in the 4 × 10 km relay at the 1968 Winter Olympics in Grenoble.

Taipale also won the silver medal in the 4 × 10 km relay at the 1966 FIS Nordic World Ski Championships. He finished fifth in the 50 km event at those same games.

Cross-country skiing results
All results are sourced from the International Ski Federation (FIS).

Olympic Games
1 medal – (1 bronze)

World Championships
 1 medal – (1 silver)

References

External links 
 
 

1940 births
Living people
Finnish male cross-country skiers
Olympic medalists in cross-country skiing
FIS Nordic World Ski Championships medalists in cross-country skiing
Medalists at the 1968 Winter Olympics
Olympic bronze medalists for Finland
Cross-country skiers at the 1968 Winter Olympics
Cross-country skiers at the 1972 Winter Olympics
Olympic cross-country skiers of Finland
20th-century Finnish people